Rochdale is a seat represented in the House of Commons of the UK Parliament. It has elected one Member of Parliament (MP) since its 1832 creation.

The constituency is represented by Tony Lloyd of the Labour Party. He was first elected MP for this seat in 2017; previously, he had been the MP for Stretford and then Manchester Central from 1983 until his resignation from Parliament in 2012.

Boundaries

As there were no township boundaries in 1832, the original constituency was defined as a circular area in a radius of three-quarters of a mile from the old market place. In 1868 the boundary was extended to include Wardleworth, Spotland, Wuerdle, Belfield, Newbold, Buersill, and Marland.

1918–1950: The County Borough of Rochdale

1950–1983: As prior but with redrawn boundaries

1983–1997: The Borough of Rochdale wards of Balderstone, Brimrod and Deeplish, Castleton, Central and Falinge, Healey, Newbold, Norden and Bamford, Smallbridge and Wardleworth, and Spotland

1997–2010: The Borough of Rochdale wards of Balderstone, Brimrod and Deeplish, Central and Falinge, Healey, Littleborough, Newbold, Smallbridge and Wardleworth, Spotland, and Wardle

2010–present: The Borough of Rochdale wards of Balderstone and Kirkholt, Central Rochdale, Healey, Kingsway, Littleborough Lakeside, Milkstone and Deeplish, Milnrow and Newhey, Smallbridge and Firgrove, Spotland and Falinge, and Wardle and West Littleborough

History

Rochdale was one of the constituencies created by the Reform Act of 1832, and has been a Labour/Liberal Democrat marginal for many years, although it was held by the Conservatives for part of the 1950s, until a 1958 by-election.

It was held for two decades by Cyril Smith, first of the Liberal Party and then of the Liberal Democrats. He won a by-election in 1972, taking the seat from Labour, and held it until his retirement in 1992. Since Smith's death it emerged Smith was a serial child abuser.

After Smith's retirement, contests have been tighter. The Liberal Democrats held the seat, with Liz Lynne at the 1992 general election, only to lose to Labour's Lorna Fitzsimons at the 1997 election. However, the Liberal Democrats regained the seat at the 2005 election, with Paul Rowen.

In 2010, the town was brought to national attention when then-Prime Minister Gordon Brown was caught on a tape recording describing a local woman, Gillian Duffy, as a "bigot" after having a conversation with her while campaigning (later described as Bigotgate by the UK media). Despite this unfavourable publicity, Labour still managed to narrowly win the seat from the Liberal Democrats; and in 2015 achieved their highest majority in the seat's history, with the Liberal Democrats falling to fourth place.

Constituency profile
The constituency is one of two covering the Metropolitan Borough of Rochdale. It contains most of the town of Rochdale itself as well as Littleborough, Wardle and some of the surrounding rural area.

For the 2010 general election, the seat gained the villages of Milnrow and Newhey from Oldham East and Saddleworth and lost the areas of Sudden, Marland, and part of Norden to Heywood and Middleton, a 19.16% boundary change. Those changes made the seat a notional Labour victory in the Rallings and Thrasher figures which were used by the Press Association for determining gains, losses and swings. However, other predictions by political commentator Martin Baxter showed the seat maintaining a narrow Lib Dem majority. The Times Guide to the House of Commons 2010 estimated that had the seat been fought on these boundaries in 2010 Labour would have won the seat with approximately 40.9% of the vote to the Liberal Democrats' 40.7%.

Members of Parliament

Elections

Elections in the 2010s

The Times Guide to the House of Commons 2010 reported that based on the notional 2005 result on the new boundaries the Labour vote had fallen by 4.5% and the Liberal Democrat vote had fallen by 6.1%, while the Conservative voteshare increased by 7.6%.

Elections in the 2000s

Elections in the 1990s

Elections in the 1980s

Elections in the 1970s

Elections in the 1960s

Elections in the 1950s

Elections in the 1940s

Elections in the 1930s

Elections in the 1920s

Elections in the 1910s

A General Election was due to take place by the end of 1915. By the summer of 1914, the following candidates had been adopted to contest that election. Due to the outbreak of war, the election never took place.
British Socialist Party: Tom Kennedy

Elections in the 1900s

Elections in the 1890s

Elections in the 1880s

Elections in the 1870s

Elections in the 1860s

 Caused by Cobden's death.

Elections in the 1850s

Elections in the 1840s

Elections in the 1830s

 Caused by Entwistle's death

See also
 List of parliamentary constituencies in Greater Manchester
 1940 Rochdale by-election
 1958 Rochdale by-election
 1972 Rochdale by-election

Notes

References

Sources 
Election results, 1950–1997 Politics Science Resources (Keele University)
FWS Craig, British Parliamentary Election Results 1918–1949
FWS Craig, British Parliamentary Election Results 1885–1918

Parliamentary constituencies in Greater Manchester
Constituencies of the Parliament of the United Kingdom established in 1832
Politics of the Metropolitan Borough of Rochdale